L'Étang-Bertrand is a commune in the Manche department in Normandy in north-western France.

See also
Communes of the Manche department
L'Oraille

References

Etangbertrand